Stygopholcus is a genus of Balkan cellar spiders that was first described by K. Absolon & J. Kratochvíl in 1932.  it contains only three species and one subspecies, found in Montenegro, Greece, Bosnia and Herzegovina, and Croatia: S. absoloni, S. photophilus, S. skotophilus, and S. s. montenegrinus.

See also
 List of Pholcidae species

References

Araneomorphae genera
Pholcidae